Plan is a 2004 Indian Hindi-language action thriller film, starring Sanjay Dutt, Priyanka Chopra, Dino Morea and Sameera Reddy. It was produced by Sanjay Gupta and directed by Hriday Shetty, the film was a rage and did exceptionally well at the single screens of India whilst  performing well at the multiplex cinemas overall the film was given a verdict of average. Released on 9 January 2004, this film is loosely based on the 1997 Hollywood comedy Suicide Kings.

Plot
Four individuals, from different walks of life, meet on a train destined towards Mumbai. They are Bobby (Dino Morea), Omi (Rohit Roy), Lucky (Sanjay Suri) and Jai (Bikram Saluja). They immediately become friends as they are alone, and only Jai has someone to live with.

Bobby dreams of becoming an actor like Amitabh Bachchan. Omi needs to get back some money from a person who borrowed it from his father. Lucky was an expert gambler in his village and intends to test his luck in Mumbai. Jai wants to regain his lost love.

It turns out that Omi had in fact made a plan with the borrower for 50% cut of the money. While Lucky starts having luck in gambling, Bobby faces hard luck in the film industry, and Jai finds out that his love, Shalini (Riya Sen), had intentionally left him, and doesn't want him back. To make Jai forget Shalini, his friends plan and hook him up with Tanya (Payal Rohatgi), a night-club prostitute, and he falls for her later. Soon after, the boys decide not to return to their village and instead enjoy the life of the city.

They enjoy the life in Mumbai, but ultimately find out that they are running short of cash. Thus Lucky decides to play a big gamble. All others pitch in whats left with them. However, the person playing opposite to Lucky cheats, resulting in Lucky owing him Rs. 700,000. They are warned to return the money in 2 weeks time, and not to leave the city.

The only solution to their problems is kidnapping a Business tycoon, who Lucky has recently seen in nightclubs. After successfully kidnapping him, they find out that he is actually Musa Bhai (Sanjay Dutt). Musa Bhai heads the Underworld Criminal Activities of Mumbai and is the most feared gangster. However, luck favors them when Musa Bhai finds out that had they not kidnapped him, he would have died, because his men had been bribed by his rival Sultan (Mahesh Manjrekar) to kill him.

The boys help Musa Bhai eliminate his disloyal men, and in return, Musa Bhai helps Bobby get a film with his love interest Sapna (Sameera Reddy), and makes a deal with the winner of the bet that if his boys win another game, the amount is off. This time when the opponent tries to cheat, Musa prevents him from doing so. As a result, the boys are freed from the burden of handling in Rs 700,000. Though Jai expresses his feeling for Tanya, she tells him that she is not suitable for such a nice boy like him and that he should return to his village.

When it comes to fighting Sultan, Musa Bhai orders the boys to go back to their villages, stating that he wishes to do so himself, but cannot, as his crimes are far too high. However the boys return to help Musa Bhai in beating Sultan, and Musa Bhai kills him. In the end, all boys depart back to their villages, with Musa Bhai bidding them farewell, and advising them to lead an honest life.

A minor sub-plot involves Rani (Priyanka Chopra), who is a bar-dancer by profession, and is in love Musa Bhai, and wants to marry him. Musa Bhai loves Rani too, but refuses to marry, instead suggesting that they should follow a non-marital affair, to which Rani refuses. In the end, Musa Bhai agrees to marry her.

Cast 
 Sanjay Dutt as Musa Bhai, the most feared Underworld Criminal in Mumbai.
 Priyanka Chopra as Rani, Musa Bhai's love interest.
 Dino Morea as Bobby, a boy who wishes to become an actor.
 Sameera Reddy as Sapna, Bobby's love interest, and his film heroine.
 Sanjay Suri as Lucky, a local gambler, who wishes to make it big in Mumbai.
 Rohit Roy as Omi, who has bluffed his father into lending money to a friend.
 Bikram Saluja as Jai, who travels to Mumbai to claim his love.
 Riya Sen as Shalini, Jai's initial love interest, later rejecting him.
 Payal Rohatgi as Tanya, a Call-Girl in a nightclub, who hooks-up with Jai, and becomes Jai's love interest.
 Sanjay Mishra as Jaggi the Pimp, to whom Jai looks forward too for finding an accommodation.
 Mahesh Manjrekar as Sultan, Musa Bhai's rival.
 Razak Khan as Film Director Atma, who is forced by Musa Bhai to hire Bobby in a film.
 Dinyar Contractor as Laxmi Seth
 Mukesh Khanna as Ali Bhai, the head of the Underworld in Mumbai; Musa and Sultan's boss.

Soundtrack 
According to the Indian trade website Box Office India, with around 12,00,000 units sold, this film's soundtrack album was the year's twelfth highest-selling.

Reception 
Taran Adarsh wrote that "On the whole, PLAN meets with the expectations partly. At the box-office, the film may open well, keeping its investors safe in the process [also thanks to its reasonable price]. At best, an average fare!" A critic from Deccan Herald wrote that "Plan is a mystery.... to its makers and its audience.The first half races along, replete with slick action and stylish camerawork; but post-interval, it runs out of steam and goes absolutely haywire".

References

External links
 

2004 films
2000s Hindi-language films
Indian action thriller films
Films scored by Anand Raj Anand
Films scored by Vishal–Shekhar
Hindi films remade in other languages
Indian remakes of American films